Petworth is an electoral division of West Sussex in the United Kingdom, and returns one member to sit on West Sussex County Council.

Extent
The division is one of the largest in West Sussex and covers the town of Petworth; and the villages of Byworth, Fittleworth, Ifold, Kirdford, Loxwood, Lurgashall, Northchapel, Plaistow, Stopham, Tillington, Upperton and Wisborough Green.

It comprises the following Chichester District wards: Petworth Ward, Plaistow Ward and Wisborough Green Ward; and of the following civil parishes: Ebernoe, Fittleworth, Kirdford, Loxwood, Lurgashall, Northchapel, Petworth, Plaistow, Stopham, Tillington and Wisborough Green.

Election results

2017 Election
Results of the election held on 4 May 2017:

2013 Election
Results of the election held on 2 May 2013:

2009 Election
Results of the election held on 4 June 2009:

2007 Bye-election
Results of the by-election held on 7 June 2007:

2005 Election
Results of the election held on 5 May 2005:

References
Election Results - West Sussex County Council

External links
 West Sussex County Council
 Election Maps

Electoral Divisions of West Sussex